Hugh Burnton Mitchell (March 22, 1907June 10, 1996), was an American politician and journalist who served as a member of the United States Senate from 1944 to 1946 and as a member of the United States House of Representatives from 1949 to 1953.  He represented the state of Washington. He left  Dartmouth College and the class of 1930 in 1929 when the Great Crash hit. He traveled to Washington State and a job as a sports reporter in 1929, but the political reporter for the Everett News was removed to prevent bias, as she was involved with the Mayor. Mitchell took over the political beat and, assessing the changing political climate, was among the first if not the first in the area to predict Franklin Roosevelt's victory as President in 1932.

Mitchell, a Democrat, was appointed on January 10, 1945 to fill a vacancy in the Senate caused by the resignation of Monrad Wallgren, who Mitchell had been executive assistant to since 1933. He proposed extending the Marshal Plan to Asia, seeing economic and infrastructure development as critical to the development of democracy. This was defeated on budget grounds by Republican adversaries, setting the stage for Truman's dependence on military containment of communist expansion, and the readmission of France to Viet Nam after World War II as a part of containment. He did not win re-election in 1946, and resigned on December 25, 1946 to give his successor seniority in committee assignments important to Washington State.

In 1948, Mitchell won election to the House of Representatives in the First Congressional District. He won his bid for re-election in 1950. He proposed integrated resource planning for the Columbia River Valley, adding fish and watershed management to irrigation and power production. This was defeated by a coalition of industrial and bureaucratic interests, including irrigation and power production private concerns and the Corps of Engineers and the Bureau of Land Management, whose authority and budgets were threatened. In 1952, Mitchell did not run for re-election, instead running for Governor of Washington to pursue state development including Columbia River Valley integrated resource development. He was unsuccessful in that election, as well as in his candidacies for the House of Representatives in 1954 and 1958. He was later appointed by President Carter to the Presidential Commission on Japanese Internment during World War II. This Commission considered that Constitutional guarantees had been violated by internment and recommended reparation to those affected.

Mitchell was known as a reformer while in Congress and helped expose the scandal surrounding the sale of World War II surplus property.

References

External links

1907 births
1996 deaths
Politicians from Great Falls, Montana
American people of Scottish descent
Democratic Party members of the United States House of Representatives from Washington (state)
Democratic Party United States senators from Washington (state)
20th-century American politicians
Dartmouth College alumni